The Rapture Tour was a concert tour by American rapper Eminem put together by Australian promoters - TEG Dainty. It was launched in support of his eighth studio album, The Marshall Mathers LP 2 (2013). Initial shows were announced in Australia and New Zealand on October 22, 2013. Eminem was accompanied on the tour by Kendrick Lamar, J. Cole, Jacob Linsley and Action Bronson. On the Oceania dates he was also accompanied by local rappers 360 and David Dallas. In 8 shows (including two dates at Wembley Stadium), Eminem sold over 315,000 tickets.

Critical reception
Darren Levin of The Guardian gave a positive review, calling the show a "half-day showcase of top-notch hip-hop talent" and commenting that Eminem has "lost none of the potency that made him such a revelation to teenagers coming of age in the early-2000s". Chris Schulz from The New Zealand Herald felt the show was "a breathless, exhilarating and seriously loud show from start to finish", though complained about 360's "ridiculous Aussie rave-rap". Michael Dwyer of The Canberra Times gave the show 3 1/2 out of 5 stars, praising Eminem's ability to remain "brilliantly in character" throughout his career.

Set list

 "Survival"
 "Won't Back Down"
 "3 a.m."
 "Square Dance"
 "Business" / "Kill You"
 "White America"
 "Mosh"
 "Rap God"
 "Still Don't Give a Fuck" / "Criminal" / "The Way I Am"
 "Fast Lane"
 "Lighters"
 "Love the Way You Lie"
 "Stan"
 "Sing for the Moment"
 "Like Toy Soldiers" / "Forever" / "Berzerk"
 "'Till I Collapse"
 "Cinderella Man"
 "The Monster"
 "My Name Is"
 "The Real Slim Shady"
 "Without Me" / "Not Afraid"
 "Lose Yourself"

Source

Shows

References

2014 concert tours
Eminem concert tours